Ganna Heorhiïvna Kalinina (also spelt Hanna) (born May 1, 1979 in Kiev, Ukrainian SSR)  is a Ukrainian sailor. She won the Silver medal in the 2004 Summer Olympics in Athens  in the Yngling class  along with Svitlana Matevusheva and Ruslana Taran.

References

1979 births
Olympic sailors of Ukraine
Ukrainian female sailors (sport)
Sailors at the 2004 Summer Olympics – Yngling
Olympic silver medalists for Ukraine
Olympic medalists in sailing
Living people
Sportspeople from Kyiv
Medalists at the 2004 Summer Olympics